Galin Dimov (born 29 October 1990) is a Bulgarian footballer who currently plays as a midfielder for Sozopol. His twin brother Plamen is also footballer. They are sons of Diyan Petkov.

References

External links 
 

1990 births
Living people
Bulgarian footballers
FC Pomorie players
Neftochimic Burgas players
FC Haskovo players
PFC Chernomorets Burgas players
PFC Dobrudzha Dobrich players
PFC Nesebar players
First Professional Football League (Bulgaria) players

Association football midfielders